John Pugh Williams (c. 1750 – 1803) was an officer in the American Revolution from Bertie County, North Carolina. He represented Bertie County in the North Carolina House of Commons in 1779 and New Hanover County in 1785, 1786, 1788, and 1789.

Military service
He was an officer during the American Revolution in North Carolina units.
 Captain in the Edenton District Minutemen (1775-1776)
 Captain in the 5th North Carolina Regiment (1776-1778)
 Colonel in the Bertie County Regiment of the North Carolina militia - 1778-1779
 Brigadier General (Pro Tempore) over the Edenton District Brigade of the North Carolina militia (May 1779)
 Colonel on Staff to Maj. Gen. Richard Caswell (1780)

It is reported that John Pugh (pronounced and sometimes spelled Pue) Williams was a brother of Benjamin Williams, the Governor of North Carolina, and that he was recommended to Thomas Jefferson for a political appointment in 1801.

References

 
 
 1790 U.S. Census; State: NC; County: New Hanover; Roll: M637_7; Page: 193; Image: 0375; Shows John Pugh Willams, esq. 1 male, 4 females, 39 slaves
 1800 U.S. Census; John P. Williams; State: NC; County: New Hanover, North Carolina, United States; citing p. 7, NARA microfilm publication M32, (Washington D.C.: National Archives and Records Administration, n.d.), roll 33; FHL microfilm 337,909

North Carolina militiamen in the American Revolution
Militia generals in the American Revolution
1803 deaths
1750s births